The 2016 Philippine Basketball Association (PBA) Governors' Cup, also known as the 2016 Oppo-PBA Governors' Cup for sponsorship reasons, was the third and last conference of the 2015–16 PBA season. Due to the preparations of the Philippines men's national basketball team for the 2016 FIBA World Olympic Qualifying Tournament, which was held in Manila, the tournament started on July 15 and ended on October 19, 2016.

Format
The tournament format for this conference is as follows:
 Single-round robin eliminations; 11 games per team; Teams are then seeded by basis on win–loss records. 
Top eight teams will advance to the quarterfinals. In case of tie, playoff games will be held only for the #4 and #8 seeds.
Quarterfinals (higher seed with the twice-to-beat advantage):
QF1: #1 seed vs #8 seed
QF2: #2 seed vs #7 seed
QF3: #3 seed vs #6 seed
QF4: #4 seed vs #5 seed
Semifinals (best-of-5 series):
SF1: QF1 vs. QF4 winners
SF2: QF2 vs. QF3 winners
Finals (best-of-7 series)
Winners of the semifinals

Elimination round

Team standings

Schedule

Results

Fourth seed playoff

Eighth seed playoff

Bracket

Quarterfinals

(1) TNT vs. (8) Phoenix

(2) San Miguel vs. (7) NLEX

(3) Barangay Ginebra vs. (6) Alaska

(4) Meralco vs. (5) Mahindra

Semifinals

(1) TNT vs. (4) Meralco

(2) San Miguel vs. (3) Barangay Ginebra

Finals

Imports 
The following is the list of imports, which had played for their respective teams at least once, with the returning imports in italics. Highlighted in gold are the imports who stayed with their respective teams for the whole conference. Players with an asterisk indicates the Asian imports.

Import handicapping

Philippine Cup final ranking comprises 60% of the points, while the elimination round ranking in the Commissioner's Cup is 40%. The four teams with most points gets to have an import of unlimited height.

Statistics

Individual statistic leaders

Awards

Conference
Best Player of the Conference: Jayson Castro 
Bobby Parks Best Import of the Conference: Allen Durham 
Finals MVP: LA Tenorio

Players of the Week

References

PBA Governors' Cup
Governors' Cup